Ganzeltopf is a traditional Alsatian goose dish, popular at Christmas, prepared much like a conserve and simmered in the oven with winter vegetables and eaten with a bottle of Sylvaner. Alsace is a region situated in the East of France along the Rhine river. It was part of Germany until being annexed by France after the Thirty Years' War.

External links
Idée recette pour les fêtes; la ganzeltopf

References 

Christmas food
Alsatian cuisine